Pedro António Matos Chaves (born 27 February 1965) is a Portuguese racing driver.

Chaves was the second Portuguese Formula Ford Champion, in 1986, starting an international career in 1987 in the British Formula Ford Championship. In 1990 he won the British F3000 Championship with the Madgwick Motorsport outfit, also racing in a few rounds of the FIA F3000 series.

In , he suffered a disastrous season in Formula One, failing to pre-qualify for 13 Grands Prix with an under-financed and uncompetitive Coloni. After failing to pre-qualify for the Portuguese Grand Prix, Chaves left the team, taking the remainder of his sponsorship money with him.

In 1992, Chaves returned to F3000, first with GJ Racing and later in the season moving to the more competitive Il Barone Rampante, with no results. Chaves then spent three years in the American Indy Lights series with Brian Stewart Racing, winning one race, in Vancouver in 1995. Chaves and Robbie Buhl were the only drivers to win that season other than Greg Moore, who won the rest of the events.  In 1996, he moved to touring car racing and was second in the Spanish Touring Car Championship in a BMW, before racing a Porsche in the FIA GT Championship.

Chaves moved to the Portuguese Rally Championship in 1998, winning the title in 1999 and 2000, with his co-driver Sérgio Paiva, in a works-supported Toyota Corolla WRC. In 2001, he took the Spanish GT Championship title, in a Saleen S7-R co-driven by Miguel Ramos. He has also gone back to drive in the 24 Hours of Le Mans and the FIA GT Championship, for Graham Nash Motorsport.

In 2005 and 2006, he returned to the Portuguese Rally Championship to drive a works Renault Clio S1600.

Chaves has since retired from racing and in 2006 became driver coach to A1 Team Lebanon. In 2008 he took over managerial duties in A1 Team Portugal. He is also managing the career of his son David.

Racing record

Complete International Formula 3000 results
(key) (Races in bold indicate pole position; races in italics indicate fastest lap.)

Complete Formula One results
(key) (Races in bold indicate pole position; races in italics indicate fastest lap)

24 Hours of Le Mans results

Complete Spanish Touring Car Championship results 
(key) (Races in bold indicate pole position; races in italics indicate fastest lap.)

References

External links
Profile at F1 Rejects
Pedro Matos Chaves at Giant Bomb

1965 births
Living people
Portuguese Formula One drivers
Coloni Formula One drivers
Indy Lights drivers
British Formula 3000 Championship drivers
Japanese Formula 3000 Championship drivers
Portuguese racing drivers
Portuguese rally drivers
International Formula 3000 drivers
24 Hours of Le Mans drivers
Sportspeople from Porto
Formula Ford drivers
A1 Grand Prix people
24 Hours of Spa drivers
Teo Martín Motorsport drivers
Nakajima Racing drivers